Mohammad Tahir was an Indian politician and lawyer who served as a member of parliament three times in 1957, 1962, 1971, member of Constituent Assembly from 1946 to 50 and member of Bihar Legislative Assembly while representing Kishanganj and Purnia Lok Sabha constituency and Purnia assembly constituency. A member of the Indian National Congress, he also served member of Constituent Assembly from 1946 to 50 and was formerly associated with the All-India Muslim League.

Biography 
He was born to Mohammad Taha in 1903 in Bengal Province, British India (in present-day Bihar, India). He grew up in Purnia district. He did his early schooling at Zila School in Purnia and obtained his Bachelor of Arts from the Muhammedan Anglo Oriental Collegiate School in Aligarh. He later attended Aligarh Muslim University where he obtained his law degree such as LL.B.

He was married to Bibi Zahida Khatoon in 1922. After she died, he married again to Khadija Khatoon in 1941. He had nine children, including seven sons and two daughters.

Political career 
Before entering in politics, he was associated with the Muslim league, a political party which was established in British India. In 1930, he was elected as a member of District Board of Purnia and vice-chairman of Sadar Local Board from 1933 to 39 and its chairman until 1941. He was later appointed as a vice-chairman of Purnia District Board from 1941 to 45.

He started his political career around 1937 when he was elected as the member of Bihar Legislative Assembly in 1937, 1946 and 1952. He was also elected a parliament member to the second (1957—62), third (1962—67) and fifth Lok Sabha collectively from 1957 to 1977.

References 

1903 births
Date of death unknown
All India Muslim League members
Indian National Congress politicians from Bihar
Bihar MLAs 1952–1957
Members of the Constituent Assembly of India
India MPs 1957–1962
India MPs 1962–1967
India MPs 1971–1977
Lok Sabha members from Bihar
Faculty of Law, Aligarh Muslim University alumni
Muhammadan Anglo-Oriental College alumni
Year of death missing